This is a list of hip hop musicians from Italy.

List of artists

 99 Posse
Achille Lauro
Amir Issaa
 Articolo 31
 Bassi Maestro
Blind
 Caparezza
Carl Brave
Clementino
 Club Dogo formerly Sacre Scuole
Coez
Dargen D'Amico
 Duke Montana
Egreen
El Presidente
Emis Killa
En?gma
Ensi
Ernia
 Esa
 Fabri Fibra
Fedez
Fred De Palma
La Famiglia
Fasma
 La Fossa
 Frankie Hi-NRG MC
 Gemelli DiVersi
Gemitaiz
Ghali
Grido (rapper)
Gué Pequeno
 DJ Gruff
Herman Medrano
 Ice One
 Inoki
Ion (rapper)
 J-Ax
 Joe Cassano
Junior Cally
Kaos One
Koito
 La Fossa
Livio Cori
Madame
Madh
Madman
 Marracash
Mudimbi
Moreno
Nayt
 Neffa
Nerone
 Nesli
Nitro
Noyz Narcos
 Otierre
 Piotta
Primo Brown
Rancore
Random
Rocco Hunt
 Sangue Misto
Salmo
Sfera Ebbasta
Shade
Shiva (rapper)
DJ Skribble
Tedua
Tha Supreme
Thema
 Tormento
Vacca
 Vincenzo da Via Anfossi
Willie Peyote

See also
Italian hip hop

Italian

it:Lista degli artisti di hip hop italiano